Double jeopardy is a type of procedural defence in legal terminology.

Double jeopardy may also refer to:

Art and entertainment and media

Film 
 Double Jeopardy (1955 film), starring Rod Cameron
 Double Jeopardy (1992 film), a TV movie starring Rachel Ward and Bruce Boxleitner
Double Jeopardy (1996 film), a TV movie starring Joe Penny, Teri Garr, Brittany Murphy, Shawn Hatosy, Rutanya Alda, and Karyn Dwyer
 Double Jeopardy (1999 film), starring Tommy Lee Jones and Ashley Judd

Television 
 Double Jeopardy!, the second round of the TV game show Jeopardy!
 "Double Jeopardy" (Highlander), an episode of the TV series Highlander: The Series
 "Double Jeopardy" (Stargate SG-1), an episode of the science-fiction series Stargate SG-1
 "Double Jeopardy" (Beast Wars), an episode of the Beast Wars series
 "Double Jeopardy" (CSI: Miami), an episode of the CSI: Miami series
 "Double Jeopardy", an episode in season 2 of the TV series The Good Wife
 Double Jeopardy (Lois & Clark episode), season 3 episode of Lois & Clark
 Double Jeopardy (Haven), season 3 episode of Haven
 Double Jeopardy (The Colbys), season 1 episode of The Colbys

Literature 
 Double Jeopardy (Hardy Boys)
 Double Jeopardy (novel), by Fletcher Pratt
 Double Jeopardy: To Be Black and Female (pamphlet), a 1969 pamphlet by Frances M. Beal

Music 
 Double Jeopardy (album), Akon album

In other uses 
 Double jeopardy (marketing), a statistical phenomenon in marketing
 Double Jeopardy Clause, protections in the United States constitution
 Double jeopardy or triple oppression, a theory about discrimination and oppression

See also

 Multiple jeopardy, a theory about discrimination and oppression
 
 Double (disambiguation)
 Jeopardy (disambiguation)